Goose Creek is a small stream in the Louisville Metro area (the former Jefferson County) of the U.S. state of Kentucky.  It is a tributary of the Ohio River.

It is the namesake of the incorporated city of Goose Creek and the Louisville neighborhood of the same name, both of which lie beside its confluence with the Ohio.

See also
 List of rivers of Kentucky
 Geography of Louisville, Kentucky

References

Rivers of Kentucky
Landforms of Louisville, Kentucky
Tributaries of the Ohio River